Kim Kyu-chul (born April 6, 1960) is a South Korean actor. Kim spent more than a decade as a stage actor before he made his onscreen breakthrough in 1993 with Im Kwon-taek's Seopyeonje, considered one of the classics of Korean cinema. Kim became most active in television, starring in dramas such as When I Miss You (1993) and Resurrection (2005).

Filmography

Television series

Film

Theater

Awards and nominations

References

External links 
 
 
 

1960 births
Living people
South Korean male television actors
South Korean male film actors
South Korean male musical theatre actors
South Korean male stage actors
Seoul Institute of the Arts alumni